Rinaldo "Dindo" Capello (born 17 June 1964) is an Italian professional racing driver. He is a three-time winner of the 24 Hours of Le Mans, with Bentley in 2003 and Audi in 2004 and 2008. Capello is a two-time American Le Mans Series champion, a five-time 12 Hours of Sebring winner, and the record holder for most wins at Petit Le Mans, having won five times. Capello has also raced in the Intercontinental Le Mans Cup, the FIA World Endurance Championship, DTM and the Italian GT Championship.

Career

Born in Asti, Capello started his racing career in 1976, driving go-karts, but did not move into single-seaters until 1983, starting in Formula Fiat Abarth. 1990 saw 
Capello's first major championship victory, winning the Italian Superturismo Championship in a Volkswagen Golf. He won the championship again in 1996, but in an Audi A4 this time.

1997 saw Capello's first major endurance victory, at Vallelunga, in the Vallelunga 6 Hours, driving a Volkswagen Golf again. Capello was selected for the 2000 Le Mans race by the Audi Sport Joest team, driving the Audi R8 - the team finished in third place.

Capello was one of Audi's six drivers for its first race under Team Joest, the 1999 12 Hours of Sebring. Alongside compatriot Michele Alboreto and Stefan Johansson, they took the first podium for Audi in endurance racing, finishing 3rd in the Audi R8R. Returning to the track in 2000, Capello took 2nd overall, beaten only by the sister Audi R8. Capello would go on to win the race the following two years, in 2001 and 2002. Capello would return a further seven times, both with Bentley and Audi, taking four overall podiums and three wins, in 2006, 2009 and 2012. Capello currently sits second all-time in overall wins at Sebring, with five outright victories. Alongside Tom Kristensen, he is the only Audi driver to have won the race in all four generations of Audi sports prototypes. The R8, R10, R15 and R18.

Due to a shift in focus for Team Joest, Capello drove for Team Bentley in 2003. Alongside long-time teammate Kristensen and Englishman Guy Smith, they won the 24 Hours of Le Mans, giving Bentley a first victory at the French circuit in 73 years.

With the end of the Bentley project, Capello returned to Audi and more specifically to Team Goh for the 2004 24 Hours of Le Mans. Alongside Japanese driver Seiji Ara and Tom Kristensen, Capello would once again stand atop the podium as the trio beat the fellow R8's of UK Team Veloqx and Champion Racing, marking the third time in five years that Audi had finished 1-2-3 at Le Mans.

Capello would not return to Le Mans until 2006, where he finished 3rd overall in the new R10 TDI. In 2007, the trio led the race for an extended period, but an issue with the left rear wheel in the 17th hour of the race saw Capello lose control on the run down to Indianapolis, and he hit the barriers, ending their race.

2008 saw Audi return to the French classic as underdogs, due to increased competition from natives Peugeot. Heading into the race, the fastest Audi in qualifying was over five seconds slower than the pole-setting Peugeot. The first half of the race was dominated by the Peugeot trio, with the 'Lion' consistently lapping over three seconds faster than the Audi's. However, a drastic change in weather conditions and the onset of rain in the second half of the race swung the momentum in favour of Audi, and a clever pit stop/tire strategy for Audi meant the no.2 R10 would go on to take a famous victory for the German manufacturer, and a third and final win for Capello. The 2008 race is documented in the film Truth in 24.

Capello also won the 12 Hours of Sebring in 2002 and 2012. He holds the record of most Petit Le Mans victories, with five in total, having won in 2000, 2002, 2006, 2007 and 2008, all of these victories coming for the Audi Sport North America and Team Joest squads.

Capello was vice-champion of the 2000 American Le Mans Series, winning 6 races. In both 2006 and 2007 Capello finished as champion alongside Britain's Allan McNish in the Audi Sport North America run R10.

Capello officially retired from prototype racing in 2012, while leading the FIA World Endurance Championship after hinting that he may not return to Le Mans in 2013. Audi's statement confirmed that Capello would continue to race in GT3 with the Audi R8 LMS Ultra.

Racing record

Career summary

Complete Italian Touring Car Championship results
(key) (Races in bold indicate pole position) (Races in italics indicate fastest lap)

Complete 24 Hours of Le Mans results

Complete 12 Hours of Sebring results

Complete Petit Le Mans results

Complete Deutsche Tourenwagen Masters results
(key)

1 -  A non-championship one-off race was held in 2004 at the streets of Shanghai, China.

Complete FIA World Endurance Championship results

References

External links
 Dindo's official website
 Interview with Dindo Capello
 Interview: Dindo Capello 

1964 births
Living people
People from Asti
Italian racing drivers
24 Hours of Le Mans drivers
24 Hours of Le Mans winning drivers
American Le Mans Series drivers
European Le Mans Series drivers
Porsche Supercup drivers
Superstars Series drivers
FIA World Endurance Championship drivers
Sportspeople from the Province of Asti
Audi Sport drivers
Team Joest drivers